Zen News ( tr. Zen Novosti; formerly Yandex.News) is a Russian news aggregator developed by Yandex in 2000 and owned by VK since 2022. 

Since 2016, it has been censored by the Russian authorities via the whitelist of media which were allowed on the Yandex main page. During the 2022 Russian invasion of Ukraine, the aggregator with a 34+ million audience (2019) aided the state propaganda by concealing all independent coverage of the war events. 

Such practices had a significant negative impact on the reputation of Yandex and are one of the core reasons behind the sanctions against the company's CEO Tigran Khudaverdyan, and president Arkady Volozh.

Operations 

Zen.News aggregates articles submitted by publishers via RSS 2.0 and ranks them according to a number of parameters. The articles are sorted and added to collections related to key events (so-called Stories). The process is automated. Since 2016, the service only aggregates publications from publishers with a license issued by Roskomnadzor.  By July 2019, the monthly audience of Zen.News (Yandex.News) totaled 34 mil users—which does not include the visitors to the Yandex main page which featured top Stories. For the top Russian media, the share of visitors from Zen.News (Yandex.News) reached up to 36%.

In 2014, it became known that the government of Moscow had learned to manipulate Zen.News (Yandex.News) search results by running a network of local online newspapers that provided positive coverage of city events. In many contexts, such as Russo-Georgian War, anti-Putin protests in Russia, and Russo-Ukrainian War, the search results and Stories were assumingly manipulated, though Yandex always denied such accusations. In 2022, Meduza reported that Yandex censored Zen.News (Yandex.News) stories as a part of a behind-the-scenes agreement with Putin's administration—and the Yandex employees knew it.

References

External links 
 Official website

Yandex software